Cathedral Pines is a  nature preserve owned and managed by The Nature Conservancy in Cornwall, Connecticut.  It is an old-growth white pine and hemlock forest which had been donated in 1967 by the Calhoun family who had purchased it in 1883 to prevent logging.  It was mostly destroyed by tornadoes in July 1989 and has become a study site for ecological restoration. It was designated a National Natural Landmark in 1982.

It is open to the public.

In his book Second Nature, writer Michael Pollan uses the aftermath of the 1989 tornado damage at Cathedral Pines as a case for an insightful discussion of environmental ethics.

References

External links
Nature Conservancy Cathedral Pines page
Natural Woodland: Ecology and Conservation in Northern Temperate Regions

Cornwall, Connecticut
National Natural Landmarks in Connecticut
Nature Conservancy preserves
Old-growth forests
Nature reserves in Connecticut
Protected areas of Litchfield County, Connecticut
1967 establishments in Connecticut
Protected areas established in 1967